The Cyrtoneurininae are a subfamily within the Diptera family Muscidae.

Genera
Arthurella Albuquerque, 1954
Cariocamyia Snyder, 1951
Charadrella Wulp, 1896
Chortinus Aldrich, 1932
Cyrtoneurina Giglio-Tos, 1983
Cyrtoneuropsis Malloch, 1925
Mulfordia Malloch, 1928
Neomuscina Townsend, 1919
Neomusciniopsis Albuquerque & Lopes
Neurotrixa Shannon & Del Ponte, 1926
Polietina Schnabl & Dziedzicki, 1911
Pseudoptilolepis Snyder, 1949

References

Muscidae
Brachycera subfamilies